Porterandia is a genus of flowering plants in the tribe Gardenieae of the family Rubiaceae native to Asia. Borneo is the centre of diversity, hosting 19 native species.

References

Rubiaceae genera
Gardenieae